Sai Kiran Vissamraju (born 8 May 1978), known professionally as Sai Kiran Ram, is an Indian actor who predominantly  works in Telugu, Malayalam and Tamil Television serials along with several Telugu films.

Personal life
He is the son of V. Ramakrishna who has sung more than 5000 songs in Telugu movies for stars like NTR, ANR, Sobhan babu, Krishnamraju, Krishna and many more in Telugu Film Industry. His Mother V.Jyothi is also a famous singer from Doordarshan Channel back in the 70s famously known as Jyothi Kanna.
His grandmother is famous playback singer P. Susheela's sister. Saikiran has involved himself in many animal rescue organizations, including the Blue Cross of Hyderabad and Friends of Snakes Society.

He is engaged with a number of spiritually-related organisations.

Saikiran recently wed a software specialist named Vyshnavi, whom he later divorced. This marriage however created a furor over TV channels as the head priest of Tirumala, Ramana Dikshitulu attended the wedding. This was unacceptable to many TV channels. Later the issue sorted out as it is believed that the priest was Saikiran's relative.

Saikiran lives in Hyderabad.

Career 
He was born in Hyderabad. He made his début with the hit film Nuvve Kavali. This was followed by a string of successful films, including Preminchu, Manasunte Chaalu, and Satta.

He has also worked in television serials, appearing as Hindu deities such as Krishna, Vishnu, and Venkateshwara.His well known serials in Tamil are Thangam and Vamsam , he made his debut in Malayalam industry with the serial
Vanambadi which is remake of Telugu serial koyilamma he plays the same role in both languages.

His first appearance as Vishnu was in Shiva Leelalu, which was made during the golden days of Ushakiran movies, e.t.v.

He is also into music, He released his first Rock music single on Lord Shiva named "Shivastaan".

Filmography

Television

Web series

Awards and nominations

References 

1978 births
Living people
Male actors in Telugu cinema
Indian male film actors
21st-century Indian male actors
Male actors from Hyderabad, India
Indian male television actors
Male actors in Telugu television
Male actors in Malayalam cinema
Tamil male television actors